or  is a lake in the municipality of Lierne in Trøndelag county, Norway.  The lake lies south of the lake Laksjøen and north of the lake Holden.

See also
List of lakes in Norway

References

Lierne
Lakes of Trøndelag